Moon Over Morocco may refer to:
 Moon Over Morocco (radio series), a 1974 radio drama
 Moon Over Morocco (film), a 1931 French mystery film